Jaak Põldma (born 16 May 1988) is an Estonian tennis player.

He is also a member of Estonia Davis Cup team.

Career finals

Singles: 2 (1–1)

Doubles: 2 (0–2)

External links

1988 births
Living people
Estonian male tennis players
Sportspeople from Tallinn
USC Trojans men's tennis players
21st-century Estonian people